This is a list of Cornish people and others resident in Cornwall who are known for their philanthropic work.
 Ralph Allen, entrepreneur and philanthropist
 Thomasine, Lady Percival (Thomasine Bonaventure)
 Elizabeth Carne, geologist and philanthropist
 Helena Charles, Cornish nationalist and humanitarian
 Prince Chula Chakrabongse of Siam
 John Passmore Edwards
 Anna Maria Fox, benefactor to Falmouth
 Sir Robert Geffrye, Lord Mayor of London
 Robert Stephen Hawker, Anglican priest, Vicar of Morwenstow
 Alice Hext
 Emily Hobhouse
 John Knill, mayor of St Ives
 Philip Melvill, benefactor to Falmouth
 William P. Treloar, businessman, Lord Mayor of London
 Bernard Walke, Anglican priest, Vicar of St Hilary

References

Philanthropists
Cornish philanthropists